Hopkinsville-Christian County Airport  is a city-owned public-use airport located two nautical miles (3.7 km) east of the central business district of Hopkinsville, a city in Christian County, Kentucky, United States.

Although most U.S. airports use the same three-letter location identifier for the FAA and IATA, this airport is assigned HVC by the FAA but has no designation from the IATA.

Facilities and aircraft
It has one asphalt paved runway designated 8/26 which measures 5,505 by 100 feet (1,678 x 30 m).

For the 12-month period ending November 21, 2008, the airport had 25,800 aircraft operations, an average of 70 per day: 87% general aviation, 7% air taxi and 6% military. At that time there were 47 aircraft based at this airport: 98% single-engine and 2% multi-engine.

References

External links
 Aerial photo as of 8 March 1993 from USGS The National Map
 
 

Airports in Kentucky
Buildings and structures in Christian County, Kentucky
Transportation in Christian County, Kentucky